Loser Anthems: B-Sides and Rarities (normally referred to simply as "Loser Anthems") is a 2001 EP release by the Matthew Good Band. The EP was issued in a limited 35,000 copies. The EP debuted at #6 on the Canadian Albums Chart, selling 11,013 copies in its first week.

Track listing
All tracks written by Matthew Good and Dave Genn.

"Flashdance II"  – 4:44
"The Man from Harold Wood"  – 2:17
"My Life as a Circus Clown"  – 2:46
"Intermezzo: M. Good vs. M. Trolley"  – 0:36
"Flight Recorder from Viking 7"  – 5:33
"Life Beyond the Minimum Safe Distance"  – 3:52
"The Fine Art of Falling Apart"  – 3:45

References

2001 EPs
Matthew Good albums
Universal Music Canada albums